Nesocordulia is a genus of dragonfly in the family Corduliidae. It contains the following species:
 Nesocordulia malgassica
 Nesocordulia villiersi

References 

Corduliidae
Taxonomy articles created by Polbot